Androbius was a painter of classical antiquity, whose time and country are unknown. He painted Scyllis, the diver, cutting away the anchors of the Persian fleet.

Notes

Ancient artists